Renmin Road Subdistrict  is a subdistrict situated in Beihu District, Chenzhou, Hunan, China. , it administers the following twelve residential neighborhoods:
Beihu Road Community
Guoqingbei Road Community
Renminxi Road Community
Feijiping Community
Wenhua Road Community
Renmindong Road Community
Wanhuachong Community
Dongfeng Community
Yanquan Road Community
Xijie Community
Guanyuan Community
Linyi Community

See also
List of township-level divisions of Hunan

References

Subdistricts of Hunan
Divisions of Beihu District, Chenzhou